Orfeas Lytras (born 28 July 1998) is a Greek professional footballer who plays as a goalkeeper for Cypriot club Nea Salamis Famagusta.

Club career

Nea Salamis Famagusta
On 7 April 2019, Lytras made his debut in the Cypriot First Division for Nea Salamis Famagusta in a game against Apollon Limassol.

References

External links
 Profile on neasalamina.com

1998 births
Living people
Greek footballers
Greek expatriate footballers
Association football goalkeepers
Nea Salamis Famagusta FC players
Cypriot First Division players
People from Phocis
Footballers from Central Greece